The Medical University, Sofia  ( в София) is a public university in Sofia, Bulgaria which was founded in 1917. It is the oldest institution for higher medical education in Bulgaria.

History

Medical University of Sofia is the oldest institution for higher medical education in Bulgaria. His Majesty Tsar Ferdinand founded it by decree in 1917 as a medical faculty of Sofia University.

M. Russev, A.M. Petrov, St. Vatev, and P. Orahovatz prepared Alexandrovska hospital’s departments for the needs of future clinics and organized training of teaching staff. Among the first professors of medicine in Bulgaria were V. Mollov, P. Stojanov, St. Kirkovitch, Iv. Kiprov (first dean), R.H. Kann, T. Petrov, Pashev, At. Teodorov, etc. In 1942 a dentistry department opened and its founders were assistant professor Sl. Davidov, assistant professor G. Stiljanov and professor Al. Stanishev.
 1917 - A law is passed by His Majesty Ferdinand I of Bulgaria for the establishment of the Medical Faculty of the Sofia University.
 1918 - Professor G. Shishkov performs the first lecture. The topic of the lecture is zoology. 
 1950 - The Decree (№ 246)  of the Presidium of the National Assembly is passed, resulting in the Medical Faculty becoming independent under the name of Medical Academy and  subsequent separation from the University of Sofia.
 1954 - The Medical Academy is renamed the Higher Medical Institute
 1972 - A unified Medical Academy is established , comprising all the senior medical institutions in Bulgaria 
 1990 - The unified Medical Academy dissolves. resulting in all higher medical institutes becoming independent
 1995 - On 21 May the Higher Medical Institute is renamed the Medical University

University hospitals
 University Multiprofile Hospital for Active Treatment „Saint Ivan Rilski“
 Alexandrovska Hospital
 University Multiprofile Hospital for Active Treatment „Saint Anna“
 University Multiprofile Hospital for Active Treatment „Тsaritsa Yoanna - ISUL“
 Specialized Orthopedic University Hospital "Prof.B.Boychev"- Gorna banya
 University Specialized Hospital for Active Treatment of Endocrinology "Acad. Ivan Pencev"
 University Hospital of Obstetrics and Gynecology 
  Maichin Dom
 Specialized Hospital for Active Treatment of Children's Diseases
 University Multiprofile Hospital for Active Treatment „St. Ekaterina“
 Multiprofile hospital for Active Treatment in neurology and psychiatry «St. Naum»
 General Hospital for Active Treatment of Pulmonary Diseases "St. Sofia"
 University Multiprofile Hospital for Active Treatment and Emergency Medicine „N.I.Pirogov“
 Specialized Hospital for Active Treatment of Infectious and Parasitic Diseases

See also
Aleksandrovska University Hospital
 List of colleges and universities

References

External links
 Medical University of Sofia website

 
Educational institutions established in 1917
1917 establishments in Bulgaria
Medical schools in Bulgaria